Roberto Serrano (born 1964) is a Spanish–American economist, currently serving as the Harrison S. Kravis University Professor of Economics at Brown University. Serrano is a Fellow of the Econometric Society and a former Member of the Council of the Game Theory Society.

Biography

Robert Serrano was born in Madrid, Spain on October 26, 1964. Roberto Serrano earned a Bachelor of Arts in Economics from the Complutense University of Madrid in 1987 and an M.A. and Ph.D in Economics from Harvard University in 1990 and 1992, respectively.

References 

1964 births
Living people
Brown University faculty
20th-century American economists
21st-century American economists
Harvard University alumni
Complutense University of Madrid alumni
Fellows of the Econometric Society